{{DISPLAYTITLE:Theta1 Orionis E}}

θ1 Orionis E (Latinised as Theta1 Orionis E) is a double-lined spectroscopic binary located 4' north of θ1 Orionis A in the Trapezium Cluster. The two components are almost identical pre-main-sequence stars in a close circular orbit, and they show shallow eclipses that produce brightness variations of a few tenths of a magnitude.

Each component of the binary system is slightly under . Although they have a subgiant spectral classification, they are still contracting onto the main sequence and are estimated to be only about 500 million years old. It is estimated that they will reach the main sequence as smaller hotter late-B stars.

The variability was first reported in 1954 and confirmed as an eclipsing binary in 2012. It has not been assigned a variable star designation but is listed in the New Catalogue of Suspected Variable Stars.

References

Orion (constellation)
G-type subgiants
5
J05351577-0523100
Orionis, Theta1E
Orionis, 41 E